The Armed Forces of the Dominican Republic are the military forces of the Dominican Republic. They consist of approximately 56,000 active duty personnel. The president is the commander in chief of the Armed Forces of the Dominican Republic and the Ministry of Defense (Spanish: Ministerio de Defensa de la República Dominicana) is the chief managing body of the armed forces. The primary missions of the Armed Forces of the Dominican Republic are to defend the nation and protect the territorial integrity of the country. The Armed Forces of Dominican Republic are the strongest army in the Caribbean after Cuba.

The Army, with  28,750 active duty personnel, consists of six infantry brigades, an air cavalry squadron and a combat service support brigade. The Air Force operates two main bases, one in southern region near Santo Domingo and one in the northern region of the country, the air force operates approximately 40 aircraft including helicopters. The Navy maintains three ageing vessels which were donated from the United States, around 25 patrol crafts and interceptor boats and two helicopters.

There is a counter-terrorist group formed by members of the three branches. This group is highly trained in counter-terrorism missions. The armed forces participate fully in counter-illegal drug trade efforts, for this task, there is a taskforce known as DEPROSER 24/7 (DEfender, PROteger y SERvir). They also are active in efforts to control contraband and illegal immigration from Haiti to the Dominican Republic and from the Dominican Republic to the United States (via illegal transportation of immigrants to Puerto Rico).

History

War of Independence

Haiti under their president Jean-Pierre Boyer had invaded and occupied  Dominican Republic from 1822 to 1844.  The military forces of the First Republic's army comprised about 4,000 soldiers organized into seven line infantry regiments, several loose battalions, 6 escudrones cavalry and 3 artillery brigades with 2/2 brigades; This army was supplemented with national civic guard militia composed of the provinces, the National Naval Armada, original name of the Navy today; It composed of 10 ships, seven owned and 3 taken in requición and armed by the government: the Cibao frigate with 20 cannons; the brigantine schooner San Jose, five guns; the schooner La Libertad, five guns; General schooner Santana 7 guns; the schooner La Merced, five guns; Separation schooner, 3 guns; the schooner February 27, five guns. The requisition taken: the schooner Maria Luisa, 3 guns; the schooner March 30, 3 guns; and the schooner Hope, 3 guns. 674 operated by a man. In addition to the aforementioned military corps expeditionary southern army recruited by Pedro and Ramon Santana in Hato Mayor and El Seibo, with a permit issued by the Central Governing Board with the rank of commander in chief of the army existed. These men were skilled in handling machete and spear. His deputy commander was Brigadier General Antonio Duvergé. The other expeditionary army was the Northern Borders created to defend these borders: its commander was Major General Francisco A. Salcedo.

The Dominican forces would reach levels of organization and efficiency of considerable notoriety. As an example of this, it would suffice to highlight the fact of the achievement and preservation of National Independence, with the Dominican victory over repeated Haitian military invasions in the 12-year period that followed the proclamation of Independence; In addition, 55 percent of the National Budget was allocated to it.

20th century

The events that led to the United States military intervention of 1916, brought about the disappearance of any vestige of military structure in the Dominican Republic, setting the intervening forces a military government headed by Captain William Knapp, who make an interim police force called "Constabulary "equivalent to an" armed police force as a military unit "and he had the task of maintaining internal order and enforce the implementing provisions of the US government. This body, purely police function disappears in 1917, leading to the creation of a National Guard. As a result of this historic event of our recent past, the country inherited a hierarchical and organizational akin to the US Marine Corps structure, which served as a platform to the transformations that later gave rise to the armed forces we know today, made up of three components, terrestrial one, one naval and one air.

This land component, now called the National Army, inherited by both its organizational structure of the National Guard organized by the US occupation forces, which operated from April 7, 1917 until June 1921, when it becomes Dominican National Police by Executive Order No. 631 of Rear Admiral Thomas Snowden, who was at that time the military governor of Santo Domingo. After the US military occupation in 1924, Horacio Vásquez wins the presidential elections of that same year. Among his first decisions, decrees the change of the Dominican National Police in National Brigade, a situation that continues until 17 May 1928, when new turn changes the name of the Army by Law No. 928, but basically inheriting a structure Police, who obeyed schemes imposition of public order demanded by the country at that time and not those of an army in their typical roles.

Due to its characteristics and missions, organizational structure that demanded presence throughout the country, which was realized with the creation of posts and detachments in different parts of the country and the establishment in some provinces of company size units, many of which still Army retains today. Over the years and already existing National Police created by decree No. 1523 of March 2, 1936 of President Trujillo, many of these units, posts and detachments became part of it, perfectly adapted to its structure, since These were essentially created to play a policing role. So great was the influence that had the National Guard in Dominican society and very particularly in the rural population, which even today are many Dominicans who often referred to the Armed Forces and unique way to the Army as " The Guard ".

Meanwhile, the Navy has remained since its inception attached to the principles that gave rise, assuming only two name changes since its inception, but gradually evolving the transformation of what was a body created for military purposes, capable of landing and ships with weapons to face possible naval invasions, to be a component mainly responsible for enforcing the provisions on navigation, trade and fishing, as well as international treaties

The Dominican Air Force, meanwhile, emerges as an independent component in 1948, under the chairmanship of Generalissimo Rafael L. Trujillo Molina, with characteristics of innovation and modernism, which gave mobility, versatility and depth to the Armed Forces and the complement in the following years would become: a military capacity to project military power in the Caribbean environment. The situation of this air component has changed significantly after reaching its climax in the 50s, when it was one of the best air force equipped in the region, which was due to the strategic guidelines of a long-lived military dictatorship It made efforts to stay in power and he saw in this component one of its mainstays against any invasion or subversion against the dictatorship.

Structure

Army of the Dominican Republic

The Dominican Army was founded in 1844. Its basic strength is concentrated in the infantry which in general can be said to be well equipped with combat rifles and combat equipment for soldiers. The vehicles (both transport and armored vehicles) and the artillery and anti-tank pieces that are in service. Currently, tanks and modern armor systems have been included.

Navy of the Dominican Republic

The Dominican Navy was founded in 1844 also with the National Independence with 15,000 troops after Haiti had occupied the eastern part of the island for twenty five years. It keeps around 34 ships in operation, mostly coast guards, patrol boats and small speedboats. It also operates dredges, tugboats and patrol boats of height. The Navy has a small air body composed helicopter utilities Bell OH-58C Kiowa.

The Navy operates two main bases, one in the port of Santo Domingo in the Dominican capital called "Naval Base 27 de Febrero" and another in Bahía de las Calderas, in the province of Peravia, called Las Calderas Naval Base in the southern part from the country. It also has presence in the commercial ports of the country, comandancias of ports and is divided into three naval areas that in turn have posts and naval detachments.

Air Force of the Dominican Republic

The Dominican Air Force was founded in 1948 with 20,000 people. It has two main bases: the base area of San Isidro in the South-Central zone of the country near the capital city Santo Domingo; and the other operates jointly in the civil facilities belonging to the Gregorio Luperón International Airport, near the city of Puerto Plata in the North of the Republic. Until August 2009, the possibility of starting military operations from the María Montez airport, in the city of Barahona in the Southwest of the country and from the Punta Cana airport in the extreme east is under study.

It keeps the following fixed-wing aircraft in operation: 8 Embraer EMB 314 Super Tucano, 3 CASA C-212-400 transport; 6 T35B Pilot training; as well as around 25 helicopters such as Bell 206, Bell UH-1 Iroquois, Bell OH-58 Kiowa, Eurocopter Dauphin, OH-6 Cayuse and Sikorsky S-300.

Specialized Security Corps

The Specialized Security Corps are military security agencies dependent on the Ministry of Defense and they are made up of military and civilian personnel specialized in their different areas of function. Overall their duty is to support state institutions, defend national interests in peace and war, and as force multiplers of the Armed Forces as well as the National Police.

Antiterrorism Command of the Dominican Armed Forces
National Department of Investigations (DNI)
Airport Security and Civil Aviation Special Forces (CESAC)
Specialized Corps of Metro and Cable Car Railway Security (CESMET)
Specialized Corps of Tourist Security (CESTUR)
Specialized Corps of Fuel Control (CECCOM)
Task Force Ciudad Tranquila (FT-CIUTRAN)
Specialized Port Security Corps (CESEP)
Presidential Security Corps (CUSEP)
Specialized Border Security Corps (CESFRONT)
National Special Corps of Enviromental and Parks Protection (SENPA) 
Military and Police Commission of the Ministry of Public Works and Communications (COMIPOL-MOPC)

See also 
List of wars involving the Dominican Republic
History of the Dominican Republic
Dominican National Police

References 

Government of the Dominican Republic